Konrad Frey (24 April 1909 in Bad Kreuznach – 24 May 1974 ib.) was a German gymnast best known to be the most successful German male competitor at a single Olympics.

With 3 Gold and 6 medals in total at the 1936 Summer Olympics, he had beaten team-mate Alfred Schwarzmann by one Silver for the honours of becoming the most successful competitor in term of total medals won, and the most successful competitor of host nation Germany. American Jesse Owens scored four medals, but all of them Gold.

In 1932, 1935 and 1937, Konrad Frey became German Champion in Men's individual all-round. After World War II, he worked again as teacher.

See also 

List of multiple Olympic medalists at a single Games
Kristin Otto—most successful German woman at a single Olympics, 6 Gold in 1988

External links 
 Database Olympics

1909 births
1974 deaths
People from Bad Kreuznach
People from the Rhine Province
German male artistic gymnasts
Gymnasts at the 1936 Summer Olympics
Olympic gymnasts of Germany
Olympic gold medalists for Germany
Olympic bronze medalists for Germany
Olympic medalists in gymnastics
Medalists at the 1936 Summer Olympics
Olympic silver medalists for Germany
Nazi Party members
Sportspeople from Rhineland-Palatinate
20th-century German people